Oumoul Khairy Thiam (born 3 February 1990) is a Senegalese basketball player. She represented Senegal in the basketball competition at the 2016 Summer Olympics.

References

External links

Senegalese women's basketball players
Basketball players at the 2016 Summer Olympics
Olympic basketball players of Senegal
1990 births
Living people
Guards (basketball)
Senegalese expatriate basketball people in Spain
Senegalese expatriate basketball people in the United States
Southern Nazarene Crimson Storm women's basketball players